F9: The Fast Saga (Original Motion Picture Soundtrack) is the soundtrack album to the 2021 film, F9. The soundtrack was released by Atlantic Records on June 16, 2021, nine days before the film's theatrical release by. To promote the soundtrack, two singles were released for it; the first one was "I Won" and the second one, "Bussin Bussin". It was then followed by four promotional singles.

Singles
The first single for the album, "I Won", was released on June 4, 2021. The single is performed by Ty Dolla Sign, Jack Harlow and 24kGoldn. The second single, "Fast Lane", was released on June 11, 2021, performed by Don Toliver, Lil Durk, and Latto. The third single, "Bussin Bussin" by Lil Tecca, was released on June 18, 2021. Four promotional singles were released on the same day the second single was released; "Furiosa", performed by Anitta, "Bushido" by Good Gas and JP the Wavy, "Mala" by Jarina de Marco and "Exotic Race" by Murci featuring Sean Paul and Dixson Waz.

Track listing

Japanese bonus tracks

Charts

References

2021 soundtrack albums
Fast & Furious albums
Atlantic Records soundtracks
Albums produced by Liam Howlett
Albums produced by FKi (production team)
Action film soundtracks
Thriller film soundtracks